A Night of Knowing Nothing is a documentary film, directed by Payal Kapadia and released in 2021. An exploration of university student life in India, the film centres on letters written by L., a student at the Film and Television Institute of India, to her estranged boyfriend after they are separated when he is forced to quit film school and denied permission from his family to continue dating L. because she is not of the same caste.

The film premiered in the Directors' Fortnight stream at the 2021 Cannes Film Festival, where it was named the winner of the L'Œil d'or award for Best Documentary Film. It was subsequently screened at the 2021 Toronto International Film Festival, where it was one of the winners of the Amplify Voices Award.

The film has been acquired for commercial distribution by Square Eyes.

Release
A Night of Knowing Nothing premiered in the Directors' Fortnight stream at the 2021 Cannes Film Festival. It is invited at 26th Busan International Film Festival and nominated for 'Busan Cinephile Award' in 'Wide Angle' section. It will be screened on 9 October 2021 in the festival.

Reception

Critical response 
On Rotten Tomatoes, the documentary holds an approval rating of 94% based on 18 reviews, with an average rating of 8/10.

Awards and nominations

References

External links

2021 films
2021 documentary films
French documentary films
Indian documentary films
2020s French films